The Tangir District is a district in Gilgit-Baltistan territory of Pakistan. It is located at a distance of 67 km from Chilas.
Its population lives mainly in the valley of the Tangir River, a right tributary of the Indus River.

History 
Prior to 2019, the Tangir District was a tehsil of the Diamer District, along with Darel and Chilas. The government of Pakistan announced the district carved out of Diamer district  of Gilgit-Baltistan.

Geography 
The Tangir District is bounded on the north by the Gupis-Yasin District, on the north-east by the Ghizer District, on the east by the Darel District, and on the south and west by the Upper Kohistan District of Pakistan's Khyber Pakhtunkhwa Province,

Notes

References

Districts of Gilgit-Baltistan